Priscilla Nedd-Friendly (born 1955) is an American film editor.

She is married to film producer David T. Friendly.

Filmography
The Darkest Hour (2011)
Big Mommas: Like Father, Like Son (2011)
The Proposal (2009)
27 Dresses (2008)
We Are Marshall (2006)
Big Momma's House 2 (2006)
The Haunted Mansion (2003)
Stuart Little 2 (2002)
Down to Earth (2001)
American Pie (1999)
Sour Grapes (1998)
The Evening Star (1996)
Clean Slate (1994)
Undercover Blues (1993)
That Night (1992)
Doc Hollywood (1991)
Guilty by Suspicion (1991)
Pretty Woman (1990)
Tucker: The Man and His Dream (1988)
Street Smart (1987)
Lucas (1986)
The Flamingo Kid (1984)
No Small Affair (1984)
Eddie and the Cruisers (1983)

External links

Living people
1955 births
American women film editors
American film editors
21st-century American women